Opera and Ballet Theatre of Saransk was inaugurated on September 9, 2011 in Saransk within the International forum Russia — the sports power. The Big symphonic orchestra made a speech at opening ceremony of P.I. Tchaikovsky, directed by Vladimir Fedoseyev. The theatre includes 714 convenient spectator places, 138 crystal lamps, convenient make-up rooms, rehearsal ballet classes, a small hall for creative meetings and chamber concerts, the whole factory with fake and property-rooms shops. The new theatre has a mini-printing house and modern sound recording studio. The light and sound equipment — from the best producers of the USA, Germany, England and Japan, a rotating scene, variable volume of the auditorium.

History 

In 1935 Carl Millöcker's operetta Der Bettelstudent opened the first season Russian theatre of the musical comedy.
From 1937 to 1941 and from 1943 to 1948 – Republican opera and ballet theatre.
In 1959 – the State musical and drama theatre of the Republic of Mordovia.
In 1969 – the State theatre of the musical comedy. In 1992 – the State musical theatre of the Republic of Mordovia.
Since 1994 the theatre is named after  of the honored artist  and the national actor of Mordovia Illarion Maksimovich Yaushev.

Illarion Maksimovich Yaushev 

The name of outstanding Mordovian singer I.M.Yaushev is forever entered in history of opera art of Mordovia, in history of musical theatre. It was at the beginnings of development of opera art in the republic, at sources of creation of the Mordovian state opera and ballet theatre.
Illarion Maksimovich was rare phenomenon on the opera scene. Possessing really huge talent and great, worthy imitations by diligence, the actor shook listeners by depth of an embodiment of high thoughts and the various characters created by composers of the different countries and eras in operas and romances, the different nationalities embodied in national songs.
The theatre is named after I.M. Yausheva, and people of Saransk try to do everything to revive opera art of Mordovia, to be worthy a name of the great singer!
«The native of the people, the son of the peasant-modvina, the former loader and the sailor, I.M.Yaushev, having graduated from the Moscow conservatory, becomes the talented singer. Possessing a fine voice and rich equipment of execution, I.M. Yaushev in the creativity continues the best traditions of Russian vocal school: Shalyapin, Sobinov, Nezhdanova». (Mantsev A. Concerts Yausheva and Pokrassa. "Truth", on July 15, 1950)

Sound equipment 
Sound equipment in a new hall allows to hold not only the classical concerts which are almost excluding microphones, here it is possible to hold any variety concert, and also to receive a high-quality sound recording. Light instead of the painted backs offers video projection system. The established equipment will demand from the service personnel of the corresponding qualification. Effectively to maintain the expensive equipment, the technicians of theatre should still to much study. By the way, opera theatre not the first experience of cooperation of Imlayt firm with Mordovia. They equipped the national theatre and sport centre  "Mordovia", they will be engaged in equipment of updated RDK.2

References

External links 
 http://www.vsar.ru/2011/09/teatr-opery-i-baleta-otkrylsya-koncertom-bso
 http://www.mteatr.h18.ru/

Saransk
Buildings and structures in Mordovia
Theatres in Russia
Tourist attractions in Mordovia
2011 establishments in Russia
Theatres completed in 2011